Alain Blanchard (born 14th century, executed in Rouen in 1419) was a commander of the crossbowmen of Rouen during the Hundred Years' War.

He was active in the defence of the city during its siege by king Henry V of England. His habit of hanging English captives from the walls of the city incurred the wrath of the English. When the city capitulated on 20 January 1419 Henry demanded that three notable inhabitants be surrendered to be decapitated. One of them was Alain Blanchard.

In literature
As a symbol of resistance to English power in France, Blanchard became a heroic figure in French literature. He is the hero of a tragedy by Antoine Viellard presented in 1793, of another play by Alexandre Dupias, presented in 1826 and of a musical drama by Ruféville with music by Adrien Boïeldieu, son of the better-known composer François-Adrien Boïeldieu. He is also presented in two poems by Auguste Thorel de Saint-Martin (1815) and Émile Coquatrix (1847) and of a story by P. Dumesnil (1849).

Bibliography 
 Théodore Licquet, Dissertation sur Alain Blanchard, Rouen, Précis de l'Académie des sciences, belles-lettres et arts de Rouen|Académie de Rouen, 1828.
 Alexandre Dupias, Réfutation du discours contre Alain Blanchard prononcé par M. Th. Licquet, président de l'Académie royale des sciences, belles-lettres et arts de Rouen en la séance publique du 26 août 1828, Rouen, N. Périaux le jeune, 1828.
 Théodore-Éloi Lebreton, Biographie rouennaise, Rouen, Le Brument, 1865.

People of the Hundred Years' War
French soldiers
1419 deaths
15th-century French people
French military personnel
Year of birth unknown
Executed French people
15th-century executions by England
People executed under the Plantagenets by decapitation
14th-century births